Philippi is a surname. Notable people with the surname include:

 Alfred Philippi (3 August 1903 – 15 June 1994), German general WWII
 Bernhard Eunom Philippi, aka Bernardo Philippi (1811–1852)
 Don Philippi, translator of Japanese
 Federico Philippi (1838–1910), German zoologist and botanist, son of Rodolfo Amando Philippi
 Friedrich Adolf Philippi (1809–1882), Lutheran theologian
 Friedrich Philippi (historian) (1853–1930), German archivist and historian
 Mark Philippi, an American powerlifter
 Rodolfo Amando Philippi (1808–1904), German-Chilean zoologist and botanist
 Waldemar Philippi (1929–1990), German footballer

See also
 Filippi, a surname